Haltadans, also known as Fairy Ring or Haltadans stone circle, is a stone circle on the island of Fetlar in Shetland, Scotland. Inside this is an earthen ring  in diameter, with a  gap in the southwest side. In the center of the rings are two rectangular pillars.

According to Jakob Jakobsen, the name Haltadans means: "lame or limping dance". This is a reference to the legend that the circle of stones was once a circle of dancing trolls and that the two rock pillars in the centre were once a fiddler and his wife. They had fiddled and danced all night long, and, heedless of the time, were still fiddling and dancing when the sun rose and petrified them all.

See also 

Stone circles in the British Isles and Brittany
List of stone circles
Neolithic Europe

References 

Archaeological sites in Shetland
Neolithic Scotland
Stone circles in Shetland
Fetlar